The Silent Call is a 1961 American drama film directed by John A. Bushelman and written by Tom Maruzzi. The film stars Gail Russell (in her final role), David McLean, Roger Mobley, Roscoe Ates, Milton Parsons and Dal McKennon.

It was released in May 1961, by 20th Century Fox.

Plot
When Joe and Flore Brancato move from Nevada to Los Angeles, their young son, Guy, is heartbroken because there is not enough room in the small family car for his huge pet dog, Pete. The animal is left behind with a somewhat unsavory neighbor, but Guy's parents promise that Pete will be sent for as soon as possible. The dog breaks away, however, tries to follow the car, and becomes lost. Guy blames his parents and becomes sullen and embittered; but the resourceful animal continues his 1,000-mile journey, hitchhiking rides and making progress despite bad weather, until eventually he arrives in Los Angeles. After creating a traffic jam, Pete is reunited with the overjoyed Guy.

Cast 
Gail Russell as Flore Brancato
David McLean as Joe Brancato
Roger Mobley as Guy Brancato
Roscoe Ates as Sid
Milton Parsons as Mohammed
Dal McKennon as Old Man
Sherwood Keith as Johnny
Jack Younger as Muscles
Rusty Wescoatt as Moose
Spike as Pete

References

External links 
 
The Silent Call at BFI

1961 films
20th Century Fox films
CinemaScope films
American drama films
1961 drama films
1960s English-language films
Films directed by John A. Bushelman
1960s American films